Kasane is a town in Botswana, close to Africa's 'Four Corners', where four countries almost meet: Botswana, Namibia, Zambia and Zimbabwe. It is at the far north-eastern corner of Botswana where it serves as the administrative center of the Chobe District. The population of Kasane was 9,244  in 2011 census.

Kasane briefly obtained international fame as the location of the remarriage of Elizabeth Taylor to Richard Burton, in 1975.

Transport

The Namibian island of Impalila lies opposite the town on the north bank of the river, and there is a border crossing by passenger ferry to Namibia. About  to the east of Kasane is the village of Kazungula, where Botswana has  of frontage to the Zambezi river immediately below its confluence with the Chobe River. Here the Kazungula border post serves the Kazungula Bridge crossing to Kazungula in Zambia on the north bank of the Zambezi.

Kasane is at the northern end of the tarred highway from Francistown and Gaborone which is a regional artery between southern and central Africa particularly for trucks too heavy for the Victoria Falls Bridge's periodic weight restrictions.  There is also a tarred road to the Namibian border 51 km west at Ngoma.

Kasane is at the north-eastern boundary of Chobe National Park and its road links make it a popular access point for tourists to the park as well as those including it in an itinerary taking in the Okavango Delta, the Caprivi Strip and Victoria Falls.

The town is served by Kasane Airport.

Amenities and social places
Kasane has a number of campsites and lodges (accommodations oriented towards the safari business). These lodges offer day trips into the Chobe National Park and Victoria Falls, and boat trips on the Chobe River.

Kasane has ABSA Bank, First National Bank, Stanbic and Standard Chartered Bank with ATM facility.

Gallery

Notes

External links

 
North-West District (Botswana)
Populated places in Botswana
Botswana–Namibia border crossings